, also known as styleos, is a Japanese video game illustrator and character designer with credits for games by Psikyo, SNK, and CAVE. During his time at SNK he designed several new characters for The King of Fighters series, including K', Maxima, and Angel.<

Published works
 The Fallen Angels (video game) (1998)
 The King of Fighters '99 (1999)
 The King of Fighters 2000 (2000)
 The King of Fighters 2001 (2001)
 Mushihimesama (2004)
 Ibara (2005)
 Pink Sweets: Ibara Sorekara (2006)

References

External links
 Official site

Japanese illustrators
Living people
Video game artists
Year of birth missing (living people)